Ligota Mała may refer to the following places in Poland:
Ligota Mała, Dzierżoniów County in Lower Silesian Voivodeship (south-west Poland)
Ligota Mała, Oleśnica County in Lower Silesian Voivodeship (south-west Poland)
Ligota Mała, Opole Voivodeship (south-west Poland)